In Greek mythology, Pelasgus (Pelasgós means "ancient") was the eponymous ancestor of the Pelasgians, the mythical inhabitants of Greece who established the worship of the Dodonaean Zeus, Hephaestus, the Cabeiri, and other divinities. In the different parts of the country once occupied by Pelasgians, there existed different traditions as to the origin and connection of Pelasgus. The ancient Greeks even used to believe that he was the first man.

Inachid Pelasgoí of Argos 
 In Argos, several Inachid kings were called Pelasgus:
 Pelasgus, brother to Apis both sons of Phoroneus, is said to have founded the city of Argos in Peloponnesus, to have taught the people agriculture, and to have received Demeter, on her wanderings, at Argos, where his tomb was shown in later times.
 Pelasgus, son of Triopas and Sois, and a brother of Iasus, Agenor, and Xanthus. According to Greek legends, he founded the sanctuary of Demeter in Argos and for this reason she was worshipped at this temple under the name Pelasgian Demeter.
Pelasgus, also known as Gelanor, son of Sthenelas or Arestor.

Arcadian Pelasgus 
 Pelasgus, either an autochthon, or a son of Zeus by Niobe (and in the latter case brother of Argus) or of Arestor (son of Iasus or Ecbasus). The Oceanide Meliboea, the nymph Cyllene, or Deianeira, became by him the mother of Lycaon and Temenus. According to Hellenistic version of the myth, Pelasgus coming from Argos, civilized the hitherto savage natives of Arcadia and founded the city of Parrhasia.
 Pelasgus, son of Arcas.

Thessalian Pelasgoí 
 Pelasgus, an Argive prince as son of Poseidon and Larissa, daughter of the Pelasgus, son of Triopas. Together with his brothers Phthius and Achaeus, they left Achaean Argos with a Pelasgian contingent for Thessaly. They then established a colony on the said country naming it after themselves: Pelasgiotis, Phthiotis and Achaea. Pelasgus was also the founder of the Thessalian Argos. He was also said to be the father of Phrastor by the nymph Menippe. Pelasgus is also said to have been the ancestor of the Tyrrhenians through the following lineage: Pelasgus - Phrastor - Amyntor - Teutamides - Nanas. In the latter's reign, the Pelasgians were believed to have left Greece and to have settled in a new land that later came to be named Tyrrhenia.
Pelasgus, father of Chlorus and grandfather of Haemon or the father of Haemon and grandfather of Thessalus instead. He may be the same man with the above Pelasgus.

Homeric Pelasgus 
In the Iliad, Homer characterizes the Pelasgians as brave fighters. To fight the war, they migrated from the Balkan peninsula into Asia Minor. The Pelasgians fought against the tribes of Greeks in the war of Troy.
 Pelasgus, father of Hippothous, one of the Trojan leaders who fought alongside the Dardanians and other allies defending the walls of the city of Troy. In some accounts Hippothous' father was called Lethus, son of the above Teutamides.

Other character 
 Pelasgus, also called Pelagon, son of the river-god Asopus by the naiad Metope, daughter of the river Ladon. He was brother to Aegina, Salamis, Thebe, Corcyra, Tanagra, Thespia, Cleone, Sinope, Peirene, Asopis, Ornea, Chalcis, Harpina, Ismene, and Ismenus. His sisters were abducted by various gods as punishment for their father's deed.

See also
Pelasgia

Notes

References 
 Apollodorus. 1921. The Library with an English translation by Sir James George Frazer, F.B.A., F.R.S. as two volumes, Cambridge, MA: Harvard University Press; London, UK: William Heinemann Ltd. . Online text and Greek text at the Perseus Digital Library .
 Dionysius of Halicarnassus. 1937–1950. Roman Antiquities. English translation by Earnest Cary [in] Loeb Classical Library, as seven volumes. Harvard University Press. Online text at Bill Thayer's website .
 Dionysius of Halicarnassus. 1885. Antiquitatum Romanarum quae supersunt, vols I-IV. Karl Jacoby. [in] Aedibus. Leipzig: B.G. Teubneri. Greek text at the Perseus Digital Library .
 Fowler, Robert L. 2013. Early Greek Mythography, vol 2: Commentary. Oxford University Press.
 Gaius Julius Hyginus, Fabulae from the Myths of Hyginus translated and edited by Mary Grant. University of Kansas Publications in Humanistic Studies. Online text at the Topos Text Project .
 Homer, The Iliad with an English Translation by A.T. Murray, Ph.D. in two volumes. Cambridge, MA., Harvard University Press; London, William Heinemann, Ltd. 1924. . Online version at the Perseus Digital Library.
Homer, Homeri Opera in five volumes. Oxford, Oxford University Press. 1920. . Greek text available at the Perseus Digital Library.
 Pausanias, Description of Greece with an English Translation by W.H.S. Jones, Litt.D., and H.A. Ormerod, M.A., in 4 Volumes. Cambridge, MA, Harvard University Press; London, William Heinemann Ltd. 1918. . Online version at the Perseus Digital Library
Pausanias, Graeciae Descriptio. 3 vols. Leipzig, Teubner. 1903.  Greek text available at the Perseus Digital Library.
 Pseudo-Clement. 1867. Recognitions from Ante-Nicene Library, volume 8, translated by Rev. Thomas Smith. Edinburgh:  T. & T. Clark. Online text at theio.com . 
 Stephanus of Byzantium. 1849. Stephani Byzantii Ethnicorum quae supersunt, edited by August Meineike (1790-1870). A few entries from this important ancient handbook of place names have been translated by Brady Kiesling, available at Online text at the Topos Text Project .

Princes in Greek mythology
Kings of Argos
Kings in Greek mythology
Children of Zeus
Autochthons of classical mythology
Legendary progenitors
Children of Poseidon
Children of Asopus
Arcadian mythology
Mythology of Argos
Thessalian mythology
Pelasgians